The  is a kofun burial mound located in between the Ōno and the Ureshino-Ueno neighborhoods of the city of Matsusaka, Mie Prefecture in the Kansai region of Japan. It was designated a National Historic Site of Japan in 1975.

Overview
The Mukaiyama Kofun is located at the end of a low hill with an elevation of 50 meters on the south bank of the Kumozu River in central Mie Prefecture. It is a "two conjoined rectangles" type tumulus. It is orientated east-to-west, with the front facing east and has a total length of 82 meters. The tumulus was constructed in two tiers, and fukiishi and fragments of clay pottery have been found scattered around the mound, but no haniwa. The burial chamber was located in the posterior portion and intersects the main axis of the tumulus at an angle. It was excavated by the local landlord in 1914, and was found to contain a clay coffin. Grave goods including three bronze mirrors, iron swords and iron spearheads, and tubular beads and wheel stones made from jasper were discovered. These artifacts are stored at the Tokyo National Museum and are estimated to date from  the latter half of the 4th century in the early Kofun period. The tumulus is located about 10-minutes by car from Ise-Nakagawa Station on the  Kintetsu Osaka Line.  

The surrounding area contains a number of large kofun from the same period, including the Takarazuka Kofun, which are distributed around Mount Asaka. 

A portion of the tumulus collapsed in 1973 due to removal of topsoil, and it received protection as a National Historic Site in 1975.

Overall length: 82.2 meters
Overall height: 10 meters
Posterior rectangular portion: 40.0 meters long x 46 meters wide x 6.0 meters high
Anterior circular portion: 35.4 meters long x 36.4 meters wide x 5.6 meters high

See also
List of Historic Sites of Japan (Mie)

References

External links
Matsusaka city home page 
Cultural properties of Mie Prefecture 

Kofun
Matsusaka, Mie
Historic Sites of Japan
History of Mie Prefecture
Ise Province